Sally Turner is an American politician serving as a member of the Illinois Senate from the 44th district. Nominated on January 25, 2021, she succeeded Minority Leader Bill Brady.

Education 
Turner earned a Bachelor of Arts degree in legal studies from the University of Illinois at Urbana–Champaign and a Master of Science in organizational leadership from Lincoln Christian University.

Career 
After earning her master's degree, Turner worked as a juvenile probation officer and paralegal in the office of the Logan County State's Attorney.

Turner was previously the County Clerk of Logan County from 1994 until 2018. Turner was appointed to the Illinois Senate by Republican leadership on January 25, 2021, to succeed former Minority Leader Bill Brady. The 44th district includes all or parts of McLean County, Illinois, Menard, Sangamon, and Tazewell counties.

She currently serves on the following committees: Tourism and Hospitality (Minority Spokesperson); Ethics; Higher Education; Human Rights; Public Safety; Revenue; State Government; App-Education; App-Health; App- State Law Enforcement; App- Criminal Justice; Redistricting- West Central IL; Credits, Deductions, and Exemptions.

Personal life
She and her husband, Appellate Court Justice John Turner, live in Beason, Illinois.

References

21st-century American politicians
21st-century American women politicians
Living people
Women state legislators in Illinois
Year of birth missing (living people)
Republican Party Illinois state senators
University of Illinois Urbana-Champaign alumni
Lincoln Christian University alumni
People from Logan County, Illinois